Parectopa interpositella is a moth of the family Gracillariidae. It is known from Texas, United States.

The larvae feed on Quercus obtusifolia. They probably mine the leaves of their host plant.

References

Gracillariinae